Zhurong is the god of fire in Chinese mythology.

Zhurong, Zhu Rong, Zhu-rong, or variations may also refer to:
 Lady Zhurong, a fictional character from the novel Romance of the Three Kingdoms, also featured in derivative properties such as Dynasty Warriors and Total War
 Zhurong (rover), a Mars rover of CNSA which landed in 2021 as part of the Tianwen-1 mission

See also

Yan Rongzhu (born 1952), a Chinese politician
Erzhu Rong (493–530), a Chinese general
 
 
 
 
 
 Zhu (disambiguation)
 Rong (disambiguation)
 Zurong (disambiguation)